Protestant Cemetery may refer to one of the following cemeteries:

 Protestant Cemetery, Rome
 Mount Zion Cemetery, Jerusalem
 Protestant Cemetery, São Paulo
 Old Protestant Cemetery (Macau)